California Proposition 52 may refer to:
 California Proposition 52 (2002)
 California Proposition 52 (2016)